Penicillium javanicum is an anamorph species of the genus of Penicillium which produces xathomegnin.

Further reading

References

javanicum
Fungi described in 1929